Ross Weare (born 19 March 1977) is a former professional footballer, who played as a forward for Queens Park Rangers and Bristol Rovers in The Football League between 1998 and 2002. He is currently manager of Clapton.

Career
Weare was born in Perivale, in London, and played for East Ham United.

He joined QPR in March 1999 and made four League appearances for the club. In July 2001, he was signed to Bristol Rovers by his old QPR manager Gerry Francis. At Bristol Rovers he scored his first professional goal in a win at Scunthorpe United. He had suffered from back injuries while with QPR, and his ongoing problems in this area lead to his premature retirement from football at the age of 25.

He later played for Isthmian League club East Thurrock United.

Managerial Career
On 26 April 2022, Weare was appointed manager of Essex Senior League club Clapton.

References

1977 births
Living people
Footballers from Ealing
English footballers
Association football forwards
East Ham United F.C. players
Queens Park Rangers F.C. players
Bristol Rovers F.C. players
East Thurrock United F.C. players
English football managers
Clapton F.C. managers